AV: The Hunt, also known as AV and also stylized as Av The Hunt, is a 2020 thriller film that was directed by Emre Akay.

Plot
Ayşe is a married woman who has been conducting an affair behind her husband's back. When this infidelity is discovered, the men in her family react violently. Her lover ends up dead in the process and Ayşe must find a way to flee to Istanbul, where she will be safe. She is given no help from her family, as they have disowned her, and even the people around her seem ambivalent at best to her obvious plight.

Cast
 Billur Melis Koç as Ayşe
 Ahmet Rıfat Şungar as Sedat
 Yağız Can Konyalı
 Adam Bay as Ahmet
 Kenan Acar		
 Baki Rıdvan Kaymaz
 Emre Yetim
 Ayşe Özköylü

Development
During the creation process Akay received an award for AV: The Hunt from the Antalya Film Forum.

Release
AV: The Hunt had its world premiere in Switzerland at the Neuchâtel International Fantastic Film Festival in July 2020, after which it screened at several other film festivals throughout the world such as FrightFest.

Reception
Multiple reviews praised the acting of Billur Melis Koç, with Screen Anarchy noting that she "does the vast majority of the heavy lifting" and comparing her favorably to Matilda Lutz in Revenge. Kim Newman also praised the acting and wrote that "It’s relentless and exciting, but also grim – with a sense of the monotonousness of entrenched male evil that’s hard to argue with but dramatically a little flat."

Awards 

 Best Film Award at Birmingham Cine-Excess (2020, won)

References

External links
 

2020 films
2020 thriller films
2020s chase films
2020s feminist films
Turkish thriller films
2020s Turkish-language films